Hyenas: a Hap and Leonard Novella is a novella written by American author Joe R. Lansdale. It is the tenth book in the Hap and Leonard series of works by Mr. Lansdale. It contains the novella Hyenas, and the short story "The Boy Who Became Invisible."

Plot summary
In this book Leonard becomes involved in a ballroom brawl that ends up leading both Hap and Leonard to a local gang of bank robbers. Hap's girlfriend Brett ends up getting abducted by the gang so the two protagonists set out to rescue her and stop the robberies.

Editions
This novella was published by Subterranean Press as both a signed limited edition (400 copies)  and a trade hardcover. Both editions have sold out.

References

External links
Author's Official Website
Publisher's Website
Artist's Website

Novels by Joe R. Lansdale
American crime novels
2011 American novels
Novels set in Texas
American novellas
Works by Joe R. Lansdale
Subterranean Press books